The Liberation of Sita is a 2016 novel by Volga, the pen name of the Telugu poet and writer P. Lalita Kumari.

References 

2016 Indian novels
HarperCollins books
Indian English-language novels